George Arthur Barnes (19 July 1883 – 1 February 1919) was an English racing motorcyclist and a pioneer aviator.

Early life
Barnes was born at Hoxton, London on 19 July 1883. He attended school at North House School Crawley.

Cycling
His first pedal cycle race in Southend was over Easter weekend in April 1901. He earned the 1 mile tandem cycle record at Crystal Palace on 8 October 1901. He also earned the one hour and 50 miles records at Crystal Palace on 19 June 1902.

Motorcycles
Between 1904 and 1905, Barnes was in a partnership with George Wilton, manufacturing and selling motorcycles as George A. Barnes & Co.; the partnership was dissolved on 17 August 1905.

Aviation
On 21 June 1910, Barnes flew a Humber monoplane at Brooklands to gain the Royal Aero Club's Aviator's Certificate No. 16,  although he was already employed by the Humber company as a pilot. In the 1911 Census of Lewisham, he described himself as an aviator living at the Crown and Anchor in Lewisham with his widowed mother.

He died of Pneumonia on 1 February 1919 at Paddington, London.

References

1883 births
1919 deaths
English aviators
Aviation pioneers
Deaths from pneumonia in England
People from Hoxton